This is a list of colleges in the United Kingdom offering higher education courses. Many of the colleges below are "listed bodies" that are authorised to offer courses leading to a degree from a UK university or other body with degree-awarding powers. Others may offer non-degree higher education courses such as Higher National Diplomas or Higher National Certificates.

Colleges of higher education should not be confused with colleges of further education, which offer a different level of qualifications.

Colleges of higher education
Academy of Contemporary Music
Academy of Live and Recorded Arts, London and Wigan
All Nations Christian College
Alpha Meridian College, Greenwich
Anglo-European College of Chiropractic
Architectural Association School of Architecture
Arts Educational Schools, London
Asanté Academy of Chinese Medicine
Bird College
Birmingham Christian College
Birmingham International College
Blackburne House Centre for Women
Blake Hall College
Brighton Institute of Modern Music
Bristol Baptist College
British College of Osteopathic Medicine
British Institute of Technology & E-commerce
British School of Osteopathy
City and Guilds of London Art School
College of Accountancy and Management Studies, Hayes, Hillingdon
College of Estate Management, Reading, Berkshire
College of the Resurrection, Mirfield
Conservatoire for Dance and Drama
Bristol Old Vic Theatre School in Bristol
Central School of Ballet in London
London Academy of Music and Dramatic Art
London Contemporary Dance School
Northern School of Contemporary Dance in Chapeltown, West Yorkshire
eCollege London
Edinburgh College of Art
EF Brittin College Manchester
English National Ballet School
 EThames Graduate School
 European School of Osteopathy
 Futureworks Media School, Manchester
Glasgow School of Art
Grafton College of Management Sciences, London
Guildford School of Acting
Guildhall School of Music and Drama
 Halifax Group of Colleges
 Albert College, Leicester|Albert College, Leicester
 Halifax College, London|Halifax College, London
 Hamilton College, London|Hamilton College, London
Hertford Regional College
Holborn College
Hult International Business School
 Impact International College
 International College Scotland
Leeds College of Business Management and Technology
Leeds College of Music
 Leeds Professional College
Leyton College 
Liverpool Institute for Performing Arts
 London Academy of Management Sciences
 London College of Advanced Studies
 London College of Business & Computing
 London College of Management Studies
London Film School
 London Institute of Shipping & Transport
 London Reading College
 London School of Accountancy & Management
London School of Business and Finance
London School of Business and Management
London School of Jewish Studies
London School of Theology
Manchester International College
Manchester Universal Academy
Maritime Greenwich College
Mont Rose College of Management and Sciences in London
National Centre for Circus Arts in London
National Film and Television School
Newcastle Academy of Business & Technology
New London College
Oxford College of London
Oxford House College
Plymouth College of Art and Design
The Prince's Drawing School
The Prince's School of Traditional Arts
Rayat London College
European Business School London
Regent's American College London
Regent's Business School London
School of Psychotherapy & Counselling Psychology
Webster Graduate School
Rose Bruford College
Royal College of Music
Royal Northern College of Music
Royal Scottish Academy of Music and Drama
Royal Welsh College of Music & Drama
SAE Institute
Scottish Agricultural College
Sotheby's Institute of Art
Taitec Manchester
Tech Music Schools
Bass Guitar-X
Drumtech
Guitar-X
Keyboardtech
Vocaltech
Trinity Laban Conservatoire of Music and Dance
UHI Millennium Institute (Institiùd OGE nam Mìle Bliadhna) (University of the Highlands and Islands)
Argyll College, Dunoon, Argyll
Highland Theological College, Dingwall
Inverness College, Inverness
Lews Castle College, Stornoway, Lewis
Lochaber College, Fort William
Moray College, Elgin
NAFC Marine Centre (North Atlantic Fisheries College), Scalloway, Shetland
North Highland College, Thurso
Orkney College, Kirkwall, Orkney
Perth College, Perth
Air Service Training, Perth Airport
Rambert School of Ballet and Contemporary Dance
Royal Academy of Dramatic Art (RADA) in London
Royal College of Arts
Sabhal Mòr Ostaig, Sleat on Skye, and Islay
Scottish Association for Marine Science, Oban, Argyll
Shetland College, Lerwick, Shetland
Sustainable Development Research Centre, Forres, Moray
University Campus Suffolk
Wessex Institute of Technology
Western Governors Graduate School
 Waltham International College
The Woolf Institute of Abrahamic Faiths, based at Wesley House, Cambridge
Centre for the Study of Jewish-Christian Relations
Centre for the Study of Muslim-Jewish Relations
Writtle College

Further education colleges offering degree courses
Access To Music
Belfast Metropolitan College
 Blackpool and The Fylde College
Bradford College
Brighton Institute of Modern Music
Bromley College of Further & Higher Education
Canterbury College
Central College Nottingham
Central Sussex College
Chaucer College
City College Brighton & Hove
Coleg Llandrillo Cymru
Colchester Institute
Cornwall College, Camborne, Newquay, St Austell and Saltash
Duchy College, Stoke Climsland and Rosewarne, Penzance
Falmouth Marine School 
Croydon College
Farnborough College of Technology
Franciscan International Study Centre
Glasgow College of Nautical Studies
Grimsby Institute of Further & Higher Education
Guildford College
Hereford College of Arts
K College
Leicester College
Loughborough College
Middlesbrough College
Myerscough College
Northbrook College
Oxford & Cherwell Valley College
Plumpton College
Redcar & Cleveland College
Selby College
South Downs College
Southern Regional College
South Gloucestershire and Stroud College
South West College
Sussex Coast College
Sussex Downs College
Stockport College
Swansea College
Truro and Penwith College
Wakefield College
Westminster Kingsway College
Weston College
Ystrad Mynach College
South Chelsea College
Peter Symonds College
Barton Peveril College

Defunct institutions
Higher education institutions that no longer exist due to closure, mergers, de-mergers etc. (but not institutions that have merely changed their name) include:

Bedford College of Higher Education, Bedford
Bell College, Hamilton and Dumfries
Bretton Hall College, Wakefield
Bulmershe College of Higher Education (BCHE), Reading
Crewe and Alsager College of Higher Education
Dartington College of Arts
Garnett College, London
Hereford College of Education, Hereford
Kent Institute of Art & Design, Canterbury, Maidstone and Rochester
National Heart and Lung Institute
Northern School of Music, Manchester
Peninsula College of Medicine and Dentistry, split into two separate medical schools
Royal College of Science, London
Royal Manchester College of Music
La Sainte Union College of Higher Education, Southampton

See also
 List of universities in the United Kingdom

Notes

References

Higher education courses